Lyakhovsky is a Russian masculine surname with a feminine counterpart being Lyakhovskaya. It is also a Russian possessive word originating from the related surname Lyakhov. It may refer to. 
Fyodor Lyakhovsky (born 1936), Soviet sprint canoer 
Irina Lyakhovskaya  (1941–2003), Russian swimmer
Lyakhovsky Islands in Russia, named after Ivan Lyakhov:
Bolshoy Lyakhovsky Island
Maly Lyakhovsky Island

See also
 Lakhovsky, a surname